Carakan may refer to:
 Çərəkən, Azerbaijan 
 Javanese script
 An ECMAScript engine developed by Opera Software